The 2015 Men's Ford National Hockey League was the 17th edition of the men's field hockey tournament. The competition was held in various cities across New Zealand, from 29 August to 20 September.

Capital won the title for the fourth time, defeating Southern 4–3 in penalties after the final finished as 0–0 draw. Auckland finished in third place defeating Canterbury 3–2 in the third place match.

Participating teams
The following eight teams competed for the title:

 Auckland
 Canterbury
 Capital
 Central
 Midlands
 Northland
 North Harbour
 Southern

Results
All times are local (NZST).

Preliminary round

Fixtures

Classification round

Fifth to eighth place classification

Crossover

Seventh and eighth place

Fifth and sixth place

First to fourth place classification

Semi-finals

Third and fourth place

Final

Statistics

Final standings

Goalscorers

References

External links
Official website

New Zealand National Hockey League seasons